Endothrix refers to dermatophyte infections of the hair that invade the hair shaft and internalize into the hair cell. This is in contrast to exothrix (ectothrix), where a dermatophyte infection remains confined to the hair surface. Using an ultraviolet Wood's lamp, endothrix infections will not fluoresce whereas some exothrix infections may fluoresce bright green or yellow-green.

References

Animal fungal diseases